The BM-21 "Grad" is a self-propelled 122 mm multiple rocket launcher designed in the Soviet Union. The system and the M-21OF rocket were first developed in the early 1960s, and saw their first combat use in March 1969 during the Sino-Soviet border conflict. BM stands for boyevaya mashina ( – combat vehicle), and the nickname  means "hail". The complete system with the BM-21 launch vehicle and the M-21OF rocket is designated as the M-21 field-rocket system. The complete system is more commonly known as a Grad multiple rocket launcher system.

In NATO countries the system, either the complete system or the launch vehicle only, was initially known as the M1964. Several other countries have copied the Grad or have developed similar systems. In Russian service its intended replacement is the 9A52-4 Tornado. Many similar 122 mm MLRS systems are made by different countries based on the BM-21 Grad.

Description 

The M-21 field rocket system with a BM-21 launch vehicle (122 mm multiple rocket launcher (MRL) system) entered service with the Soviet Army in 1963 to replace the aging 140 mm BM-14 system. The launch vehicle consists of a Ural-375D 6x6 truck chassis fitted with a bank of 40 launch tubes arranged in a rectangular shape that can be turned away from the unprotected cab. 

The original vehicle together with supporting equipment (including the re-supply truck 9T254 with 60 rockets) is referred to by the GRAU index "9K51". The launcher itself has the industrial index of "2B5". In 1976, the BM-21 was mounted on the newer Ural-4320 6x6 army truck.

The three-member crew can emplace the system and have it ready to fire in three minutes. The crew can fire the rockets from the cab or from a trigger at the end of a  cable. All 40 rockets can be away in as little as 20 seconds, and can be fired individually or in small groups in several-second intervals. A PG-1M panoramic telescope with a K-1 collimator can be used for sighting.

Each  rocket is slowly spun by rifling in its tube as it exits, which along with its primary fin stabilization keeps it on course. Rockets armed with high explosive-fragmentation, incendiary, or chemical warheads can be fired .

The number of rockets that each vehicle is able to quickly bring to bear on an enemy target makes it effective, especially at shorter ranges. One battalion of eighteen launchers is able to deliver 720 rockets in a single volley. The system has lower precision than gun artillery and cannot be used in situations that call for pinpoint accuracy. It relies on a large number of shells dissipating over an area for a certain hit rate on specific targets. Because of the short warning time for the impact of the whole volley, the BM-21 is still considered an effective weapon.

Variants

Russia 
 BM-21: Original version known as the BM-21 launch vehicle. The launcher unit was mounted on a modified Ural-375D truck chassis.

 BM-21-1: Launch vehicles are mounted on a family of Ural-4320 truck chassis.
 2B17 or also BM-21-1: This upgrade was presented for the first time in 2003 and was developed by Motovilikha Plants from Perm. The truck is the Ural-43201.

 9P138 "Grad-1": lighter 36-round version, mounted on a 6x6 ZIL-131 chassis. The vehicle with supporting equipment (rockets, transporter 9T450 and re-supply truck 9F380) is referred to as complex 9K55. It used to be known in the West as BM-21b or M1976.

 BM-21V "Grad-V" (Vozdushnodesantniy – 'airborne') (NATO designation M1975): Developed for Soviet airborne troops in 1969. A GAZ-66B 4x4 truck chassis is fitted with a 12-round 122 mm rocket launcher. The vehicle is sturdy enough to be air-dropped. Parts of the vehicle such as the canvas cab roof can be taken off or folded down to reduce its size during transit. Like the BM-21, the BM-21V has stabilizing jacks on the rear of the vehicle for support when firing. The launch vehicle has the industrial index of 9P125.

 9А51 "Prima": 50-round launcher on a Ural-4320 5t chassis. The vehicle together with fire control equipment, the ammunition transporter TZM 9T232M and the new rocket 9M53F is referred to as complex 9K59. Apparently only a small number was produced.

 "Grad-P Light portable rocket system": The complete system comprises a  single-round man-portable launcher (it can be reloaded and used again), a 9M22M 122 mm high-explosive fragmentation rocket and a fire control panel. The system was developed in the middle of the 1960s for Soviet special units and was used by Vietnamese forces at war with the US, under the designation DKZ-B. It was not accepted for regular service with the Russian Army, but it was and is still popular with paramilitary and guerrilla forces.

 BM-21PD "Damba" (Protivodiversionnyi): 40-round launcher mounted on Ural-375D or 43201 truck chassis. Developed for protection of naval bases against underwater infiltrations, uses special ammunition PRS-60 (Protivodiversionnyi Reaktivnyi Snaryad). The vehicle together with ammunition transporter is referred to as complex DP-62 "Damba".

 A-215 "Grad-M": 20-round naval version, entered service in 1978.

 9K51M "Tornado-G": an advanced version of the original BM-21 vehicle with sophisticated fire control system, satellite navigation, and automatic target aiming.

 TLRS "Trolley Launched Rocket System": an advanced trolley mounted rocket launcher used by Russian Armed forces in the 2022 Russian invasion of Ukraine. 

Adaptations of the launcher were/are produced by several countries including China, Czechoslovakia, Egypt, Iran, North Korea, Poland and Romania.

Belarus 

 BM-21A "BelGrad": This is a modernized version, based on a MAZ-631705 6×6 truck with 425 hp diesel engine TMZ-8424. Between the cab and the launcher there is another pack of 40 rockets. The system was evaluated from 1997 and entered service in 2001.

Ukraine 

 BM-21K: A modernization based on a modified double-cab KrAZ-260 chassis with an improved fire control system.
 Bastion-1: A modernization based on the KrAZ-260 chassis.
 Bastion-2: A modernization based on the KrAZ-260 chassis with additional storage space for 40 missiles.
 BM-21 UM Berest
 Verba: A modernization based on a modified double-cab KrAZ-6322 chassis with a digital fire control system. Georgia 

 RS-122 Magaria: In March 2012, the Republic of Georgia unveiled its own heavily modified self-propelled version of the BM-21 Grad. There are innovative improvements similar to that of its Polish counterpart. The crew cabin is armoured and well-protected in accordance with STANAG level 2 or higher. The 40-tube launcher is fitted with a pinpoint targeting system and has a maximum firing distance of 45 km depending on ammunition, guaranteeing much more precision at greater distances. There is enough room for an additional 40-tube pack. The launcher can be deployed and activated directly from inside the crew cab, greatly decreasing time between salvos. However, the traditional external setup is also available. An entire barrage can be fired in less than 20 seconds. The general purpose platform can also be used for more sophisticated rocket systems.საქართველოს თავდაცვის სამინისტრო . Mod.gov.ge. Retrieved on 1 June 2017.

 People's Republic of China 
 : The People's Republic of China produces the Type 81, which was copied from Russian BM-21s captured in the 1979 Sino-Vietnamese War. After reverse engineering, it entered service with the PLA in 1982 where its upgraded version nowadays known as PHZ81. Due to the fact that it is a direct copy, the Type 81 is extremely similar to its Russian predecessor. Its 40 tubes are mounted on a Shaanxi Automobile Works Yan'an SX2150 6x6 truck, which unlike the original Russian version, has a cab protected by blast shields.
 : This is a 24-round version, based on a Dong Feng truck. The launch tubes are arranged in three rows of 8.
 : This is basically the 40-round launcher of the BM-21 or Type 81 mounted on a tracked chassis with 520 hp diesel engine. The same chassis is also used for the Type 83 152 mm self-propelled howitzer (PLZ83), the Type 89 120 mm tank destroyer (PTZ89) and several other specialised vehicles. Its current PLA designator is PHZ89.
 : The NORINCO (China North Industries Corporation) Type 90 40-round multiple rocket system is an indigenously designed and built system equipped with an automatic operating and laying system, an electric firing system and an automatically reloadable pack of 40 rockets. It is very similar to the M-77 Oganj but of 122 mm calibre. The chassis used is the Tiema SC2030 6×6 truck. A Type 90 MRL battalion consists of three batteries, each with 6 self-propelled rocket launchers, 6 ammunition re-supply trucks Tiema XC2200 with 80 rockets and a battery command post on a DongFeng EQ-245 6×6 truck.
 : Modernised version, based on a Tiema XC2200 6×6 truck chassis and fitted with a modern fire control system with GPS. The command post vehicle can lay and control a number of Type 90A systems by remote control for maximum firepower.
 : Latest, digitalised version. The rocket launch vehicle is based on a Beifang Benchi 2629 series 6×6 truck (Mercedes-Benz copy) and has a longer cabin. Each set now also has three forward observer vehicles, based on the armoured WZ551.
 : Development of Type 90B SPMRL with firepower increased by 25% (50 rounds compared to the original 40 rounds). Incorporate features of Weishi series self-propelled multiple rocket launchers (WS SPMRL) series so that the operating cost and overall life cycle cost for both when most components of PR50 is interchangeable with that of WS series. Also incorporated is a feature originated in Type 90B, which is the adoption of rockets of different ranges, so PR50 has a wide range of 20 km to 40 km.
 : A lightweight and more compact derivative of unguided 122 mm PR50 SPMRL for rapid deployment, with number of tubes reduced by 60% to 40 * from the original 100 of PR50 MLS.

 : A guided version of 122 mm PR50 MLS with primitive cascade inertial terminal guidance, with standard range of 20 to 30 km
 CTL-181A MRL: A Dongfeng Mengshi variants fitted with 122 mm multiple rocket launcher and modular ammunition storage unit. 

 Czechoslovakia, Czech Republic 

 RM-70 (122 mm RAKETOMET vz. 70): In 1972 the Czechoslovak Army introduced its own version of the BM-21 launch vehicle, designated the RM-70. The launcher unit comprises a bank of 40 launch tubes arranged in 4 rows of 10 and it is mounted on an 8x8 10-ton modified Tatra 813 truck. Unlike the BM-21, the RM-70 has an armoured cab and enough room behind it to allow for the storage of further 40 rockets. Those rockets can be directly reloaded into launcher at the same time.
 RM-70/85: Modification of RM-70 launch vehicle on unarmored Tatra 815 truck.
 RM 70 Vampire: RM 70 modern version on Tatra 817 chassis with digital fire control system, introduced in 2015.
 BM-21 MT: Bm-21 launch vehicle on Tatra 817 chassis with digital fire control system, without spare rack for immediate reload, introduced in 2022.

 Poland 

 WR-40 "Langusta" (eng. European spiny lobster) (wyrzutnia rakietowa means rocket launcher): This is a modern Polish version with a new fire control system (with ballistic computer BFC201 and navigation system Sigma 30) and a modified launcher based on the Jelcz P662D.35G-27 6×6 truck, produced by Jelcz Komponenty. The first vehicle entered service on 20 March 2007. Probably about half of all 227 Polish BM-21 launchers will be converted into WR-40 launchers. The Jelcz P662.D.35 truck with lightly armoured cab is also believed to be the base of a Polish multiple rocket launcher complex, which will possibly be developed in the future.

 Egypt 
Rather than a standard HE-Frag round, the Egyptian military prefers a  cluster munition, which can be extremely effective against lightly armored equipment and troop concentrations. Both rockets, as well as the original Soviet models of course, are fired by locally manufactured rocket launchers like the RL-21 (copy of BM-11) and RC-21 (copy of BM-21, similar to the Hadid HM20). The Helwan Machine Tools Company also produces portable systems with one, three, four and eight launch tubes.

 Gaza Strip 
Since 2006 Hamas has fired 122 mm Grad rockets, copies made in Iran, and Eastern-bloc versions modified to expand their range into Israel. The rockets were believed to be brought into the Gaza Strip via tunnels from Egypt. Some of the rockets were of a Chinese Grad variant. Hamas sources said they were pleased by the performance of the Chinese variants of the BM-21 Grad rocket, which demonstrated a far greater range and blast impact than Palestinian-made rockets, as well as Russian-origin Grads or Katyushas.Israeli Ministry of Foreign Affairs, "Terror in Gaza: Twelve months since the Hamas takeover ", 16 June 2008.

They also published a clip claiming device mounted used as a multi-barrel rocket launcher on vehicle used for first time in Gaza. On 7 April 2011, the Iron Dome system successfully intercepted a Grad rocket launched from Gaza for the first time. The rockets were launched without their dedicated platforms and by untrained operators which causes very low accuracy. Over 50% of the rockets miss entire cities and over 10% end up hitting the sea.

 Ethiopia 
The Homicho Ammunition Engineering Complex produces the rockets while the Bishoftu Motorization Engineering Complex produces the launching tubes and has converted existing trucks to diesel engine. Bishoftu motorization has also produced a six tube launcher to be mounted on light trucks.

 North Korea 
 BM-11: North Korean 30-tube version. The tubes are arranged in 2 banks of 15; all rockets can be fired in as little as 15 seconds. The basis for the BM-11 system is an unlicensed copy of the Japanese-manufactured Isuzu HTS12G 2.5 ton truck chassis.
 MRL 122 mm M1977: U.S. DIA code for a system that appears to be a direct copy of the BM-21 "Grad".
 MRL 122 mm M1985: This is a more modern version, based on an Isuzu 6×6 truck and probably with a 40-round reload pack mounted between the cab and the launcher.

 Iran 
 HM20: This is the Iranian version of the BM-21, mounted on a Mercedes-Benz 2624 6×6 truck. The launch pack however consists of 2 packs of 20 tubes. Reportedly there is also a version with an automatic reload-system, latest version is mounted on 6×6 MAN trucks.
 HM23: Lighter 16-round version with two packs of 8 launch tubes.
 HMxx: Iranian version of the 30-round BM-11, based on a Mercedes-Benz LA 911B 4x4 truck. Some vehicles are equipped with a light hydraulic crane.

 Iraq 
Various 122mm-type rockets were deployed by Iraq during the Iran-Iraq war, modified to deliver nerve agents to targets. This included the 40-inch long, domestically produced Grad MLRS-compatible "Borak" warhead designed to disperse sarin gas.

 Pakistan 

 KRL 122: Kahuta Research Laboratories from Pakistan have developed a rocket launcher based on the BM-21 Grad. The KRL 122 was originally based on an Isuzu truck but later models use the Reo M35 truck. Some sources mention the designator Gadab. In addition to the original Soviet rockets, the system can launch the Yarmuk Rocket developed by Pakistan Ordnance Factories. The KRL 122 has achieved a maximum range of over 40 km due to the use of upgraded 122 mm rockets. 

 Romania  

  ( – rocket launcher): Romanian 21-round launcher (3 rows of 7) mounted on a Bucegi SR-114 4x4 chassis. No longer used by the Romanian Army but some vehicles have been exported to Nigeria and Croatia. Morocco has the launch pack mounted on a Kaiser M35 truck.
 : Initially this designator was used for the original BM-21 "Grad" in Romanian service, but Aerostar SA has developed an improved model, based on a DAC-665T 6x6 truck. A slightly improved model, called APRA-40 or 40 APRA 122 FMC is based on the DAC 15.215 DFAEG truck. Each launcher is normally accompanied by a re-supply truck MITC with a 6t crane and a trailer RM13. The system is also used by Botswana, Bosnia, Cameroon, Croatia, Iran, Iraq, Liberia and Nigeria.
 LAROM or LAROM 160: This is an upgraded version that was developed in cooperation with Israel. The launch vehicle is based on the truck chassis DAC 25.360 DFAEG, fitted with two launch packs with each 20 122 mm tubes or 13 160 mm tubes. The system entered service with the Romanian Land Forces in 2002.

 Serbia 

 LRSVM Morava: Universal modular MLRS with possibilities to use all models of Grad 122 mm rockets, both with M-77 Oganj and M-63 Plamen 128 mm rockets too.
 G-2000: Produced by EdePro, G-2000 122 mm missile is with range above 40 km.

 South Africa 
 Valkiri: This is a South African design based on Grad 21a Unimog truck chassis by Denel using 127 mm rockets.
 Bateleur: A newer, more accurate version of the Valkiri. Based on the Withings (White Stallion) military recovery truck chassis. Also produced by Denel it was used against the Ethiopian regime in the war of Ogaden 1977.

 Thailand 
 DTI-2: The 122 mm multiple rocket launcher by Defense Technology Institute.

 Croatia LRSV-122 M-96 "Tajfun" (samovozni višecijevni lanser raketa): Modified version of M-77 Oganj with 128mm barrels replaced with 122mm barrels due to lack of missiles in 128mm caliber, in 4 rows of 8 launch tubes for use with Grad calibre rockets placed on unarmoured Tatra T813 truck instead of FAP trucks that were damaged beyond repair. About 4 of such conversions were done on Tatra chassis. Like the M-77 Oganj, the launcher and reloading pack are covered by a collapsible awning for protection and camouflage when travelling. Combat weight: 23.5 t. Only a very small number was built.LRSV-122 M-92 "Vulkan"' (samovozni višecijevni lanser raketa): Modified version of M-77 Oganj with 128mm barrels replaced with 122mm barrels due to lack of missiles in 128mm caliber, in 4 rows of 8 launch tubes for use with Grad caliber.

 Projectiles 
The latest technology development has allowed new Grad rockets to have 52 km range. The range may also vary due to the type of warhead.

Also Incendiary, Chemical, Illumination, Antipersonnel mines.

 Operators 

Current operators
 
 : 85 in 1980 and 48 
 : 100 in 1980 and 50 
 : 47 
 : 43 
 : 126 BM-21 . Used 9P138.
 : 1 (BM-21) 36 (APR-40)
 : 20 APRA-40 
 : 24 
 : 5 APR-40 
 : 12 
 : 80 
 : 20 
 : 6 and 5 Type-81 
 
 : 10 
 : 24 
 : 6 
  
 : 4 
 : 18  and mounted on a KAMAZ chassis since 2019
 : 60 BM-21 and 96 BM-11 
 : 35 
 : 50 
 Tigray Defense Forces
 : 34 Soviet-made units on Ural-4320 6x6 chassis known as 122 RakH 76 have been phased out of Finnish service, Finland continues to use 36 Ex-GDR RM-70/85s under the designation 122 RakH 89''.
 : 13 
 : 240 upgraded BM-21/LRARs 
 : 100+ BM-21 and 7 BM-11 
 : BM-21 and 9P138.
 Iraqi Kurdistan
 : 58 
 : 100 in service and 100 in store 
 : 5 
 : 15 
 : Paraded in January 2019.
 : 11 
 
 
 : 6 
 : 18 in 2012, more than 30 in 2016 according to the Military Balance
 : 14
 : 20+ 
 : 130 
 : 36 in 1980 and 35 
 : 12 
 : 230 9P138 "Grad-1" which are upgraded with MAM-01's turrets and rocket launchers, 20 Chinese Type-81 and 90 Type-90B in service.
 : 5 
 : 18 BM-21 and 100 BM-21P single-tube rocket launchers 
 : 25 APR-21 
 
 : 938 as of 2021.
 : Hamas and other militants (including Iranian made 20 km range and Chinese 40 km range Grad variants)
  People's Defense Units (YPG): one
 : 22 
 : 250 in 1980 and 75 . In 2018 unknown quantity RM-70 and BM-21 Grads sold to Czech Republic and many donated to North African countries (Libya ?). 93 in 2020. At least 20 units were supplied to Ukraine. It will be replaced by M142 HIMARS.
 : 135 APR-40 (54 being upgraded to LAROM), 6 BM-21 on boats 
 : 982; rockets with the expired term using for training 9F839-1 Bobr. 2,500 (1,700 of them in storage) as of 2012 (Military Balance International Institute for Strategic Studies 2012). 70 modernized Grad-M units were delivered in 2016. 18 more in 2020.
 : 8 Grad-U
 : 348
 
 
 
 : 120 
 
 : 3 
 : 58 
 : 70  Also used 9P138.
 : 185 BM-21s . Also used 9P138.
  Russian separatist forces in Donbas
 : 6+ 
 : 36 . Used 9P138.
 : 24 
 : 350 
 : 280
 : 30 (12 serviceable)

Former operators

 : 31 
 : 72 units, passed on to the successor state.
 : 40 in service in 1980.
 
 : Passed on to successor states.
 : 65+, supplied in 1979
 
 : Passed on to successor states.

Evaluation only
 : 75

See also 
 Katyusha, BM-13, BM-8, and BM-31 multiple rocket launchers of World War II
 BM-14 140 mm multiple rocket launcher
 BM-27 Uragan 220 mm multiple rocket launcher
 BM-30 Smerch 300 mm multiple rocket launcher
 Pinaka multi-barrel rocket launcher
 9A52-4 Tornado variable caliber multiple rocket launcher and successor to the BM-21, BM-27, and BM-30
 ASTROS II (Brazil)
 Fajr-5 (Iran)
 T-122 Sakarya (Turkey)

References

Bibliography

External links 

 122 mm Multiple Rocket Launcher (MRL) "GRAD" on the Ural-375 6×6 truck chassis – Walk around photos
 Globalsecurity.org
 Enemyforces.com
 Splav State Research and Production Enterprise
 BM-11 at FAS.org
 RM-70 at Army.cz
 WR-40 Langusta at krucjata.org.pl 
 Iraq BM-21 
 Полевая реактивная система М-21 (M-21 Field Rocket System)
 Легкая переносная реактивная система "Град-П" (Grad-P Light portable rocket system)
 Shooting battalion (strike multiple rocket launchers) YouTube
 The Grad system: A hot hail of cluster-fired rockets

Wheeled self-propelled rocket launchers
Cold War artillery of the Soviet Union
Self-propelled artillery of Iran
Multiple rocket launchers of the Soviet Union
Chemical weapon delivery systems
NPO Splav products
Cluster munition
Military equipment introduced in the 1960s